HMS Ferret was a  which served with the Royal Navy from 1893 and was sunk in 1911.

Construction
Ferret was armed with one 12-pounder and three 6-pounder guns, and three torpedo tubes (two on deck mounts and one fixed bow tube).  The bow tube was soon removed, and provision was made for removing the deck tubes and substituting two extra 6-pounder guns. She carried a complement of 42 (later raised to 53).  Later in her career she was fitted out for boom breaking as an experiment. Her forebridge, gun and bow tube were removed and the turtle backed forecastle was strengthened for this purpose.

Service history
Ferret was launched on 9 December 1893 and completed in 1895.

She took part in the Coronation Review for King Edward VII on 16 August 1902, with Lieutenant Arthur William Tomlinson temporarily in command from 8 August.

She was sunk as a target in 1911.

References

Bibliography

 

Ferret-class destroyers
1893 ships
Ships sunk as targets